Miss International 2002, the 42nd Miss International pageant, was held on 30 September 2002 in Tokyo, Japan at the Century Hyatt. Małgorzata Rożniecka of Poland crowned her successor Christina Sawaya of Lebanon at the end of the event.

This edition also saw the crowning of the first-ever woman of Middle Eastern descent to win Miss International, Christina Sawaya representing Lebanon.

Results

Placements

Contestants

  – Jerianne Tiel
  – Carla Ameller
  – Milena Ricarda de Lima Lira
  – Alicia Victoria Altares
  – Amy Yan Wei
  – Consuelo Guzman Parra
  – Luz Thonysha De Souza
  – Nichole Stylianou
  – Lenka Taussigova
  – Jeimi Vanessa Hernández Franjul
  – Isabel Cristina Ontaneda Pinto
  – Katariina Kulve
  – Emmanuelle Jagodsinski
  – Eva Dedecke
  – Stella Yiaboura
  – Evelyn Arreaga
  – Chun Hui Chen
  – Cathy Wu Kar-Wai
  – Gauahar Khan
  – Shelly Dina'i
  – Hana Urushima
  – Gi Yoon-joo
  – Christina Sawaya
  – Marta Pancevska
  – Krystal Pang Chia Boon
  – Alison Abela
  – Velia Rueda Galindo
  – Mariana Moraru
  – Marianela Lacayo
  – Christine Juwelle Cunanan
  – Cristina Herrera
  – Kristine Alzar
  – Monika Angermann
  – Mariela Lugo Marín
  – Kseniya Efimtseva
  – Mame Diarra Mballo
  – Marie Wong Yan Yi
  – Zuzana Gunisova
  – Laura Espinosa Huertas
  – Emelie Lundquist
  – Piyanuch Khamboon
  – Nihad El-Abdi
  – Nihan Akkus
  – Juliet-Jane Horne
  – Mary Elizabeth Jones
  – Cynthia Cristina Lander Zamora
  – Aleksandra Kokotovic

Notes

Withdrawals
  – Neelam Voorani (forced by her Islamic government to withdraw from the pageant 3 days before the finals)

References

Further reading

External links
 Pageantopolis – Miss International 2002

2002
2002 in Tokyo
2002 beauty pageants
Beauty pageants in Japan